Kemi Adetiba  (born 8 January 1980) is a Nigerian filmmaker, television director and music video director, whose works have appeared on Channel O, MTV Base, Sound City TV, BET and Netflix.

Education 
Kemi holds bachelor's degree in law from the University of Lagos.

Early life
Kemi was born in Lagos to Dele and Mayen Adetiba. She featured in a Television commercial for the detergent brand  OMO as a child.

Personal life
Kemi got engaged to Oscar Heman-Ackah in January 2022, and they were married in April of the same year.

Career
Kemi started out professionally as a radio presenter with Rhythm 93.7 FM, where she became the voice behind two nationally syndicated hit shows: Soul’d Out and Sunday at the Seaside. She started anonymously posting personal remixes online on various applications such as Spotify and Soundcloud under the username and tag 'hule'.

She began to make a transition from being a voice on radio, to being a face on television by producing and presenting several shows on Mnet, which includes Studio 53, Temptation Nigeria, which she presented alongside Ikponmwosa Osakioduwa. Kemi was also a presenter on Soundcity TV and hosted Maltina Dance All for three consecutive seasons.

After years of success being in front of the camera, she enrolled at the New York Film Academy to learn the ropes about being behind the cameras.  And today, her bodies of work as a director are spread across the African continent and beyond its borders. Kemi Adetiba's short film Across a Bloodied Ocean was screened at the 2009 Pan African Film Festival and National Black Arts Festival.

On 8 September 2016, Kemi Adetiba's first feature film The Wedding Party (a Nigerian Rom-com film) premiered opening night, at the Toronto International Film Festival (TIFF), as the opening film of the City-to-City Spotlight.

In 2017 she was presenting the show King Women where she interviewed her mother Mayen Adetiba. Other former King Women included Chigul, Taiwo Ajai-Lycett, TY Bello and Tara Durotoye

Awards and nominations
Her works have won her several awards, which include Best Female Video for the song "Ekundayo" by TY Bello at the Soundcity TV Music Video Awards, Best Female Video for the song "Today na Today" by Omawumi at the 2010 Nigeria Entertainment Awards. Adetiba's most recent works are music video direction of Waje’s "Onye" which features Tiwa Savage, Olamide's "Anifowose", "Sitting on the Throne" and Bez's R&B single "Say".

Kemi was nominated for Best Music Video Director of the Year at The Headies 2014. She won the City People Entertainment Award for Best Music Video Director Of The Year (2015) and a HNWOTY Award for Woman of the Year in Film and Television (2017)

Filmography
The Wedding Party (2016)
King of Boys (2018)
King of Boys: The Return of the King (2021)

Videography

2017: King Women
2015: "Last Bus-Stop" by Niyola 
2015: "Dance Go (Eau de Vie)" for Hennessy Artistry '15 (feat. Wizkid and 2face Idibia)
2015: "Out A Magazine" by Lindsey Abudei
2014: "My Darlin" by Tiwa Savage
2014: "My Place" by Lynxxx
2014: "Love to Love You" by Niyola (featuring Banky W.)
2014: "Sitting on the Throne" by Olamide
2014: "Anifowose" by Olamide
2014: "Onye" by Waje
2013: "Toh Bad" by Niyola
2013: "Say" by Bez
2012: "If I Die" by Da Grin
2012: "Tease Me/Bad Guys" by Wizkid
2011: "I Believe" by Ego
2011: "Follow You Go" by Banky W.
2011: "The Future" by TY Bello
2010: "Fall in Love" by Ego
2010: "Lagos Party" by Banky W.
2010: "More You" by Banky W. 
2011: "Today Na Today" by Omawumi
2008: "Ekundayo" by TY Bello
2016:  The wedding party
2018: King of boys
2021: The return of king of boys

See also
 List of Nigerian cinematographers

References

External links

Living people
Nigerian film directors
Nigerian women film directors
Nigerian cinematographers
Nigerian music video directors
Yoruba women filmmakers
Filmmakers from Lagos
Silverbird Communications people
Yoruba-language film directors
New York Film Academy alumni
1980 births
University of Lagos alumni
Nigerian women film producers
Nigerian film producers